= Kirchoff's Building =

Building in South Africa

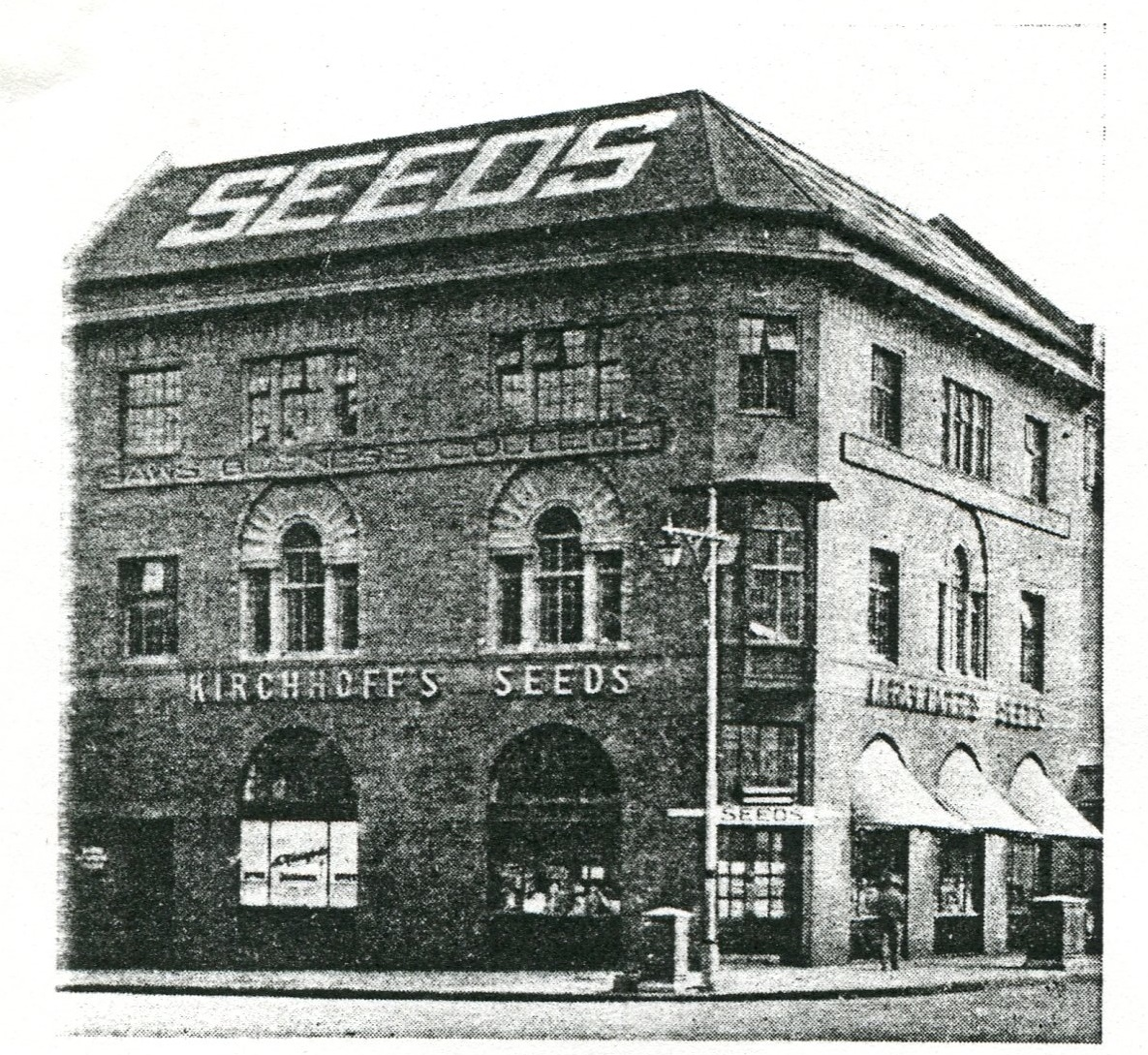
- cnr Jeppe and Loveday str
- Interactive map of the Kirchoff's Building area

General information
- Status: Completed
- Location: Johannesburg, South Africa
- Completed: 1929

Height
- Roof: 9 metres (30 ft)

Technical details
- Floor count: 2

Design and construction
- Architects: Hentrich Petschnigg & Partners

The Kirchoff's Building is an Edwardian building on the corner of Jeppe and Loveday street in the city of Johannesburg. It was home to one of the oldest seed wholesalers in South Africa.
